Whore is a 1991 American drama film directed by Ken Russell and starring Theresa Russell (no relation to Ken). It follows the life of a jaded street prostitute in Los Angeles. Antonio Fargas, Jack Nance, Danny Trejo, and Ginger Lynn Allen appear in supporting roles. The screenplay by Russell and Deborah Dalton is based on David Hines' monologue play, Bondage. Throughout the film, the lead character often breaks the fourth wall, addressing the audience with monologues consisting of her observations and reflections on her career as a prostitute.

The film was released in the United Kingdom on June 21, 1991, and in the United States on October 21, 1991 by Trimark Pictures. While not a financial success, grossing a little over $1 million, the film did attract some positive notices from critics, particularly for Theresa Russell's performance. The film was given an NC-17 rating in the United States, and was banned in Ireland due to its depiction of sexuality and violence. The film generated the unrelated sequel Whore II in 1994.

Plot 
Liz is a Los Angeles street prostitute who is first seen attempting to get a customer on a busy downtown street near a tunnel. She addresses the audience directly on her life and problems throughout the film. One man stops and demands anal sex, and she crassly declines him. When a van stops by, she also brushes the driver off, recalling the last time she serviced a man in a van: it turned out there were several other men in the van, who gang-raped her, beat her, and left her for dead. An elderly man passing by gives her his handkerchief and offers to take her to a hospital. She refuses, makes up a boyfriend story and asks for some money. She sends him the money back with a thank you note and a new handkerchief.

Liz is not merely attempting to get a customer, however: she is attempting to escape her pimp, Blake. Blake is a well-dressed, businesslike and extremely controlling man.

As Liz stops off at a strip club for a drink, she explains how she ended up as she did: She was a small town girl, who married a violent drunk named Charlie. Though they have a child together, she can no longer cope and leaves him, taking her son with her, as he is sleeping it off. She takes a job on the graveyard shift at a diner, and when a customer offers her more money to have sex with him, she decides, given her rather low pay, to take it. She does this independently for a time until she meets Blake, who takes her to Los Angeles. Though Blake does do some things for her (including getting her tattooed), he is ultimately as cruel as her husband, so she decides to escape from him.

While working downtown, Liz finds a fellow prostitute who has just been viciously stabbed in the stomach by a john. Liz brings the woman into a movie theater bathroom and attempts to stop her bleeding wound. She is helped by a patron in the theater, Katie, with whom Liz becomes good friends. Katie is an intellectual and loans Liz the novel Animal Farm, the first book Liz has ever finished reading. The women's friendship, however, ends after Blake intimidates Liz.

A local homeless person/street performer named Rasta decides to treat Liz to a movie. Though Rasta initially frightens Liz (his act involves walking on broken glass), Liz agrees. At this point the scenes of Liz and Rasta at the movie are intercut with Blake explaining his life to the audience, giving the impression that Liz and Rasta are watching Blake's soliloquy. Liz recounts some of her prostitution stories, including her encounter with a male client with a shoe fetish who demanded that Liz merely insult him while he masturbated with her stiletto in his mouth.

After the movie, Liz talks to the audience about her son, whom she clearly loves, though he is now in foster care. Later that night, Liz secures an elderly dapper client, who brings her to a parking garage in his vintage car. While the two have sex, the man suffers a heart attack, and Liz panics, trying to give him mouth-to-mouth resuscitation, without success. Blake happens along then. He takes Liz's money and tries to rob the dead customer before getting into a physical altercation with Liz, breaking one of her fingers. When Liz tries to stop him, Blake tries to strangle Liz and threatens to force her son into gay prostitution, with Liz retorting "I'll kill you first!". Rasta comes to the rescue, killing Blake. A grateful Liz gives her thanks and walks away.

Cast

Production 
The original play Bondage on which the film was based was written by a London taxi driver David Hines (b. 1945), who based it on a conversation with a local prostitute he drove. The play was performed at the Edinburgh Fringe Festival.

Ken Russell wrote, "one day in London, Hines literally jumped out of his cab and stopped me in the street, to ask if I would write the screenplay; and make it into a film. I read the play and agreed to have a go." The play was about a British girl working in King's Cross, but Russell said, "No one in England wanted to know. So I had to go to America for the lolly. Now she's a Hollywood hooker on Sunset Boulevard. So why couldn't I get financed in the UK? The budget was low, the potential high, the risk minimal. Perhaps the subject was considered too sleazy for export. Maybe it could never have been shown on TV. Maybe my face doesn't fit in with the film establishment here."

Filming 
Lacking large studio support, the film was produced and distributed by Trimark Pictures. The film's small shooting budget is reflected in the choppy editing and production values. Presumably to save on crew expenses, Ken Russell is listed as camera operator in production credits (under the name Alf).

Release

Box office
Whore grossed $1,008,404 internationally.

Censorship 
Whore was given an NC-17 rating by the Motion Picture Association of America (MPAA) in the United States. Its distributor, Trimark Pictures, appealed the MPAA's ruling, but the rating was ultimately upheld, and the film was released under the NC-17 rating.

In the Republic of Ireland, the film was banned on August 9, 1991. The decision was upheld by the Films Appeal Board on September 20, although an earlier appeal meeting held on August 28 failed to come to a decision. This postponed the Irish home release as well, due on the week of the failed appeal with 2,000 copies. The video distributor (National Cable Vision) submitted a tape to Sheamus Smith, who headed the Irish Film Censor Board at the time, for a reconsideration on home media – no evidence exists of whether or not this was successful.

Critical response
The film received mixed reviews. On Rotten Tomatoes, it has a 38% rating based on thirteen reviews.

Roger Ebert praised Russell's performance, and gave the film a three out of four-star rating. The Los Angeles Timess Kenneth Duran alternately criticized Russell's performance as "game but dismal," and summarized the film as a "heroically tedious motion picture...  The worst thing about “Whore,” however, is not how feeble it is, for bad films come and very quickly go, but the pathetically venal way in which its creators have exploited the problem of prostitution and its glorification in the media."

Home media
The film quickly transitioned to pay-per-view and VHS release in R-Rated (85 minutes) and Unrated (88 minutes) versions. It also released on video under its tagline If You Can't Say It, Just See It.

On August 5, 2022, Australian label Imprint Films released Whore for the first time on Blu-ray in a limited edition, featuring new interviews with actresses Theresa Russell and Ginger Lynn, writer Deborah Dalton, and filmmaker Bruce LaBruce.

Sequel
An unrelated direct-to-video sequel, Whore II, was released three years later in 1994, written and directed by Amos Kollek. Coincidentally, a clip from Kollek's earlier film, High Stakes, is seen in Whore.

References

External links 
 
 
 

1991 films
1991 drama films
1991 independent films
American drama films
American independent films
1990s English-language films
Films about prostitution in the United States
Films directed by Ken Russell
Films set in Los Angeles
Films shot in Los Angeles
Gang rape in fiction
Films about rape in the United States
Trimark Pictures films
1990s American films
Censored films
American films based on plays
Sexual-related controversies in film